Tox or TOX may refer to:

Science and technology
 TOX, a protein encoded by the TOX gene
 Tox screen, medical diagnostic screening for toxic substances

Computing
 Tox (protocol), peer-to-peer instant messaging software
 tox (Python testing wrapper), a tool used for continuous testing with the Python programming language

Places
 Tox, Haute-Corse, a French commune on the island of Corsica

People
 Daniel Halpin (born 1985), British graffiti artist also known as Tox

See also

Ton (disambiguation)